Hosdurg is one of four taluks that constitute the Kasaragod District, Kerala. Others are Kasaragod, Manjeshwaram and Vellarikundu taluks. In the north, it borders Kasaragod taluk; in south, the Kannur District; in the east, Vellarikundu taluk; and in the west, the Arabian sea. With an area of 900.3 km2 (90030 hectares), it was the smaller of the two taluks. Then Hosdurg bifurcated into Vellarikund and Hosdurg taluks in 2013 for ease of administration. Kanhangad and Nileshwaram are the municipalities within the taluk. Hosdurg (after which the taluk is named) is a kilometer south of Kanhangad town, the latter being the taluk headquarters. Other major settlements include Trikarpur, Cheruvathur and Udma. Bekal Fort tourism is situated in the taluk. The name Hosdurg comes from the Kannada word hosa ("new") and Sanskrit word  durg ("fort").

Demographics
As per the 2011 census, Hosdurg taluk had a total population of 625641 persons, which included 295,859 males and 329,782 females. The literacy rate is 85.82%, higher than the national average. In Hosdurg taluk, 12.42% of the total population is between the ages of 0–6 years. Malayalam is the administrative language of the region.

Taluks of Kasaragod

Constituent Villages
Hosdurg taluk has 31 revenue villages.

See also
Kasaragod taluk
Vellarikundu

External links
 Official_Website_of_Kasaragod_district

References

Geography of Kasaragod district
Taluks of Kerala